Embarrass Township is one of fifteen townships in Edgar County, Illinois, USA.  As of the 2010 census, its population was 620 and it contained 288 housing units.

Geography

Cities, towns, villages
 Brocton

Unincorporated towns
 Borton
 Isabel

Extinct towns
 Catfish
 New Athens

Cemeteries
The township contains these five cemeteries: Catfish, Catfish Point, Embarrass, Scott and Zimmerman.
Shield cemetery lies on Coles county line, half in Embarrass township. Housel cemetery has records also.

Major highways
  Illinois Route 49
  Illinois Route 133

Airports and landing strips
 Ewing Landing Strip
 Lamkey Landing Strip

Demographics

School districts
 Kansas Community Unit School District 3
 Oakland Community Unit School District 5
 Shiloh Community Unit School District 1

Political districts
 Illinois' 15th congressional district
 State House District 110
 State Senate District 55

References
 
 United States Census Bureau 2007 TIGER/Line Shapefiles
 United States National Atlas

External links
 City-Data.com
 Illinois State Archives
 Edgar County website

Townships in Edgar County, Illinois
Populated places established in 1856
Townships in Illinois